Dhak Narang Shah Pur  is a village in Phagwara Tehsil in Kapurthala district of Punjab State, India. The village is administrated by a Sarpanch, who is an elected representative.

Demography 
According to the report published by Census India in 2011, Dhak Narang Shah Pur has 121 houses with the total population of 671 persons of which 341 are male and 330 females. Literacy rate of Dhak Narang Shah Pur is 85.43%, higher than the state average of 75.84%.  The population of children in the age group 0–6 years is 74 which is 11.03% of the total population.  Child sex ratio is approximately 947, higher than the state average of 846.

Population data

References

External links
  Villages in Kapurthala
 Kapurthala Villages List

Villages in Kapurthala district